This is a list of companies traded on the JSE. The original compilation of the list was done in February 2006.



Note: For companies without a listed external link there is at various financial information sites; please see article's External links section below.

A

B

C

D

E

F

G

H

I

J

K

L

M

N

O

P

Q

R

S

T

U

V

W

Y

Z

See also
:Category:Companies of South Africa
JSE Limited
List of African stock exchanges

References 

 A - Z JSE Shares - https://jseshares.co.za/shares/ Updated 2017
 4. TOP 100 JSE Shares - https://www.sashares.co.za/top-100-jse-companies/ Updated 2020

Companies
JSE
JSE